Zerka may refer to:
Jordan River, Biblical name Zerka
Zarqa, a town in Jordan
Monsef Zerka, a French-born Moroccan footballer
Zerka T. Moreno, American psychotherapist

See also
Zerkaa (born 1992), English YouTuber
Zerker (disambiguation)